Cultural studies is an interdisciplinary field that examines the political dynamics of contemporary culture (including popular culture) and its historical foundations. Cultural studies researchers generally investigate how cultural practices relate to wider systems of power associated with, or operating through, social phenomena. These include ideology, class structures, national formations, ethnicity, sexual orientation, gender, and generation. Employing cultural analysis, cultural studies views cultures not as fixed, bounded, stable, and discrete entities, but rather as constantly interacting and changing sets of practices and processes. The field of cultural studies encompasses a range of theoretical and methodological perspectives and practices. Although distinct from the discipline of cultural anthropology and the interdisciplinary field of ethnic studies, cultural studies draws upon and has contributed to each of these fields.

Cultural studies was initially developed by British Marxist academics in the late 1950s, 1960s, and 1970s, and has been subsequently taken up and transformed by scholars from many different disciplines around the world. Cultural studies is avowedly and even radically interdisciplinary and can sometimes be seen as anti-disciplinary. A key concern for cultural studies practitioners is the examination of the forces within and through which socially organized people conduct and participate in the construction of their everyday lives.

Cultural studies combines a variety of politically engaged critical approaches drawn including semiotics, Marxism, feminist theory, ethnography, post-structuralism, postcolonialism, social theory, political theory, history, philosophy, literary theory, media theory, film/video studies, communication studies, political economy, translation studies, museum studies and art history/criticism to study cultural phenomena in various societies and historical periods. Cultural studies seeks to understand how meaning is generated, disseminated, contested, bound up with systems of power and control, and produced from the social, political and economic spheres within a particular social formation or conjuncture. The movement has generated important theories of cultural hegemony and agency. Its practitioners attempt to explain and analyze the cultural forces related and processes of globalization.

During the rise of neoliberalism in Britain and the US, cultural studies both became a global movement, and attracted the attention of many conservative opponents both within and beyond universities for a variety of reasons.  A worldwide movement of students and practitioners with a raft of scholarly associations and programs, annual international conferences and publications carry on work in this field today. Distinct approaches to cultural studies have emerged in different national and regional contexts.

Overview

Sardar's characteristics 
In his 1994 book, Introducing Cultural Studies, orientalist scholar Ziauddin Sardar lists the following five main characteristics of cultural studies:

The objective of cultural studies is to understand culture in all its complex forms, and analyzing the social and political context in which culture manifests itself.
Cultural study is a site of both study/analysis and political criticism. For example, not only would a cultural studies scholar study an object, but they may also connect this study to a larger political project.
Cultural studies attempts to expose and reconcile constructed divisions of knowledge that purport to be grounded in nature.
Cultural studies has a commitment to an ethical evaluation of modern society.
One aim of cultural studies could be to examine cultural practices and their relation to power, following critical theory. For example, a study of a subculture (such as white working-class youth in London) would consider their social practices against those of the dominant culture (in this example, the middle and upper classes in London who control the political and financial sectors that create policies affecting the well-being of white working-class youth in London).

British cultural studies
There are numerous published accounts of the history of cultural studies.

Dennis Dworkin writes that "a critical moment" in the beginning of cultural studies as a field was when Richard Hoggart used the term in 1964 in founding the Centre for Contemporary Cultural Studies (CCCS) at the University of Birmingham. The centre would become home to the development of the intellectual orientation that has become known internationally as the "Birmingham School" of cultural studies, thus becoming the world's first institutional home of cultural studies.

Hoggart appointed as his assistant Stuart Hall, who would effectively be directing CCCS by 1968. Hall formally assumed the directorship of CCCS in 1971, when Hoggart left Birmingham to become Assistant Director-General of UNESCO. Thereafter, the field of cultural studies became closely associated with Hall's work. In 1979, Hall left Birmingham to accept a prestigious chair in sociology at the Open University, and Richard Johnson took over the directorship of the centre.

In the late 1990s, "restructuring" at the University of Birmingham led to the elimination of CCCS and the creation of a new Department of Cultural Studies and Sociology (CSS) in 1999. Then, in 2002, the university's senior administration abruptly announced the disestablishment of CSS, provoking a substantial international outcry.  The immediate reason for disestablishment of the new department was an unexpectedly low result in the UK's Research Assessment Exercise of 2001, though a dean from the university attributed the decision to "inexperienced 'macho management'." The RAE, a holdover initiative of the Margaret Thatcher-led British government of 1986, determines research funding for university programs.

To trace the development of British Cultural Studies, see, for example, the work of Richard Hoggart, E. P. Thompson, Raymond Williams, Stuart Hall, Paul Willis, Angela McRobbie, Paul Gilroy, David Morley, Charlotte Brunsdon, Richard Dyer, and others.

Stuart Hall's directorship of CCCS at Birmingham
Beginning in 1964, after the initial appearance of the founding works of British Cultural Studies in the late 1950s, Stuart Hall's pioneering work at CCCS, along with that of his colleagues and postgraduate students gave shape and substance to the field of cultural studies. This would include such people as Paul Willis, Dick Hebdige, David Morley, Charlotte Brunsdon, John Clarke, Richard Dyer, Judith Williamson, Richard Johnson, Iain Chambers, Dorothy Hobson, Chris Weedon, Tony Jefferson, Michael Green and Angela McRobbie.

Many cultural studies scholars employed Marxist methods of analysis, exploring the relationships between cultural forms (i.e., the superstructure) and that of the political economy (i.e., the base). By the 1970s, the work of Louis Althusser radically rethought the Marxist account of base and superstructure in ways that had a significant influence on the "Birmingham School." Much of the work done at CCCS studied youth-subcultural expressions of antagonism toward "respectable" middle-class British culture in the post-WWII period. Also during the 1970s, the politically formidable British working classes were in decline. Britain's manufacturing industries while continuing to grow in output and value, were decreasing in share of GDP and numbers employed, and union rolls were shrinking.  Millions of working-class Britons backed the rise of Margaret Thatcher, through the labour losses.  For Stuart Hall and his colleagues, this shift in loyalty from the Labour Party to the Conservative Party had to be explained in terms of cultural politics, which they had been tracking even before Thatcher's first victory.  Some of this work was presented in the cultural studies classic, Policing the Crisis, and in other later texts such as Hall's The Hard Road to Renewal: Thatcherism and the Crisis of the Left, and New Times: The Changing Face of Politics in the 1990s.

Late-1970s and beyond
By the late 1970s, scholars associated with The Birmingham School had firmly placed questions of gender and race on the cultural studies agenda, where they have remained ever since. Also by the late 1970s, cultural studies had begun to attract a great deal of international attention. It spread globally throughout the 1980s and 1990s. As it did so, it both encountered new conditions of knowledge production, and engaged with other major international intellectual currents such as poststructuralism, postmodernism, and postcolonialism. The wide range of cultural studies journals now located throughout the world, as shown below, is one indication of the globalization of the field.

Developments outside the UK
In the US, prior to the emergence of British Cultural Studies, several versions of cultural analysis had emerged largely from pragmatic and liberal-pluralist philosophical traditions. However, in the late 1970s and 1980s, when British Cultural Studies began to spread internationally, and to engage with feminism, poststructuralism, postmodernism, and race, critical cultural studies (i.e., Marxist, feminist, poststructuralist, etc.) expanded tremendously in American universities in fields such as communication studies, education, sociology, and literature. Cultural Studies, the flagship journal of the field, has been based in the US since its founding editor, John Fiske, brought it there from Australia in 1987.

A thriving cultural studies scene has existed in Australia since the late 1970s, when several key CS practitioners emigrated there from the UK, bringing British Cultural Studies with them, after Margaret Thatcher became Prime Minister of the UK in 1979. A school of cultural studies known as cultural policy studies is one of the distinctive Australian contributions to the field, though it is not the only one. Australia also gave birth to the world's first professional cultural studies association (now known as the Cultural Studies Association of Australasia) in 1990. Cultural studies journals based in Australia include International Journal of Cultural Studies, Continuum: Journal of Media & Cultural Studies, and Cultural Studies Review.

In Canada, cultural studies has sometimes focused on issues of technology and society, continuing the emphasis in the work of Marshall McLuhan, Harold Innis, and others. Cultural studies journals based in Canada include Topia: Canadian Journal of Cultural Studies.

In Africa, human rights and Third-World issues are among the central topics treated. There is a thriving cultural and media studies scholarship in Southern Africa, with its locus in South Africa and Zimbabwe. Cultural Studies journals based in Africa include the Journal of African Cultural Studies.

In Latin America, cultural studies have drawn on thinkers such as José Martí, Ángel Rama, and other Latin-American figures, in addition to the Western theoretical sources associated with cultural studies in other parts of the world.  Leading Latin American cultural studies scholars include Néstor García Canclini, Jésus Martín-Barbero, and Beatriz Sarlo. Among the key issues addressed by Latin American cultural studies scholars are decoloniality, urban cultures, and postdevelopment theory. Latin American cultural studies journals include the Journal of Latin American Cultural Studies.

Even though cultural studies developed much more rapidly in the UK than in continental Europe, there is significant cultural studies presence in countries such as France, Spain, and Portugal. The field is relatively undeveloped in Germany, probably due to the continued influence of the Frankfurt School, which is now often said to be in its third generation, which includes notable figures such as Axel Honneth. Cultural studies journals based in continental Europe include the European Journal of Cultural Studies, the Journal of Spanish Cultural Studies, French Cultural Studies, and Portuguese Cultural Studies.

In Germany, the term cultural studies specifically refers to the field in the Anglosphere, especially British Cultural Studies, to differentiate it from the German Kulturwissenschaft which developed along different lines and is characterized by its distance from political science. However, Kulturwissenschaft and cultural studies are often used interchangeably, particularly by lay people.

Throughout Asia, cultural studies have boomed and thrived since at least the beginning of the 1990s. Cultural studies journals based in Asia include Inter-Asia Cultural Studies. In India, the Centre for Study of Culture and Society, Bangalore and the Department of Cultural Studies at The English and Foreign Languages and the University of Hyderabad are two major institutional spaces for Cultural Studies.

Issues, concepts, and approaches
Marxism has been an important influence upon cultural studies. Those associated with CCCS initially engaged deeply with the structuralism of Louis Althusser, and later in the 1970s turned decisively toward Antonio Gramsci. Cultural studies has also embraced the examination of race, gender, and other aspects of identity, as is illustrated, for example, by a number of key books published collectively under the name of CCCS in the late 1970s and early 1980s, including Women Take Issue: Aspects of Women's Subordination (1978), and The Empire Strikes Back: Race and Racism in 70s Britain (1982).

Gramsci and hegemony
To understand the changing political circumstances of class, politics, and culture in the United Kingdom, scholars at The Birmingham School turned to the work of Antonio Gramsci, an Italian thinker, writer, and Communist Party leader.  Gramsci had been concerned with similar issues: why would Italian laborers and peasants vote for fascists? What strategic approach is necessary to mobilize popular support in more progressive directions? Gramsci modified classical Marxism, and argued that culture must be understood as a key site of political and social struggle. In his view, capitalists used not only brute force (police, prisons, repression, military) to maintain control, but also penetrated the everyday culture of working people in a variety of ways in their efforts to win popular "consent."

It is important to recognize that for Gramsci, historical leadership, or hegemony, involves the formation of alliances between class factions, and struggles within the cultural realm of everyday common sense. Hegemony was always, for Gramsci, an interminable, unstable and contested process.

Scott Lash writes:

Edgar and Sedgwick write:

Structure and agency
The development of hegemony theory in cultural studies was in some ways consonant with work in other fields exploring agency, a theoretical concept that insists on the active, critical capacities of subordinated people (e.g. the working classes, colonized peoples, women). As Stuart Hall famously argued in his 1981 essay, "Notes on Deconstructing 'the Popular'": "ordinary people are not cultural dopes." Insistence on accounting for the agency of subordinated people run counter to the work of traditional structuralists. Some analysts have however been critical of some work in cultural studies that they feel overstates the significance of or even romanticizes some forms of popular cultural agency.

Cultural studies often concerns itself with the agency at the level of the practices of everyday life, and approaches such research from a standpoint of radical contextualism. In other words, cultural studies rejects universal accounts of cultural practices, meanings, and identities.

Judith Butler, an American feminist theorist whose work is often associated with cultural studies, wrote that:

Globalization
In recent decades, as capitalism has spread throughout the world via contemporary forms of globalization, cultural studies has generated important analyses of local sites and practices of negotiation with and resistance to Western hegemony.

Cultural consumption
Cultural Studies criticizes the traditional view of the passive consumer, particularly by underlining the different ways people read, receive and interpret cultural texts, or appropriate other kinds of cultural products, or otherwise participate in the production and circulation of meanings. On this view, a consumer can appropriate, actively rework, or challenge the meanings circulated through cultural texts. In some of its variants, cultural studies has shifted the analytical focus from traditional understandings of production to consumption - viewed as a form of production (of meanings, of identities, etc.) in its own right. Stuart Hall, John Fiske, and others have been influential in these developments.

A special 2008 issue of the field's flagship journal, Cultural Studies, examined "anti-consumerism" from a variety of cultural studies angles.  Jeremy Gilbert noted in the issue, cultural studies must grapple with the fact that "we now live in an era when, throughout the capitalist world, the overriding aim of government economic policy is to maintain consumer spending levels. This is an era when 'consumer confidence' is treated as the key indicator and cause of economic effectiveness."

The concept of "text"
Cultural studies, drawing upon and developing semiotics, uses the concept of text to designate not only written language, but also television programs, films, photographs, fashion, hairstyles, and so forth; the texts of cultural studies comprise all the meaningful artifacts of culture. This conception of textuality derives especially from the work of the pioneering and influential semiotician, Roland Barthes, but also owes debts to other sources, such as Juri Lotman and his colleagues from Tartu–Moscow School. Similarly, the field widens the concept of culture.  Cultural studies approach the sites and spaces of everyday life, such as pubs, living rooms, gardens, and beaches, as "texts."

Culture, in this context, includes not only high culture, but also everyday meanings and practices, a central focus of cultural studies.

Jeff Lewis summarized much of the work on textuality and textual analysis in his cultural studies textbook and a post-9/11 monograph on media and terrorism. According to Lewis, textual studies use complex and difficult heuristic methods and require both powerful interpretive skills and a subtle conception of politics and contexts.  The task of the cultural analyst, for Lewis, is to engage with both knowledge systems and texts and observe and analyze the ways the two interact with one another. This engagement represents the critical dimensions of the analysis, its capacity to illuminate the hierarchies within and surrounding the given text and its discourse.

Academic reception
Cultural studies has evolved through the confluence of various disciplines—anthropology, media studies, communication studies, Literary Studies, education, geography, philosophy, sociology, politics, and others.

While some have accused certain areas of cultural studies of meandering into political relativism and a kind of empty version of "postmodern" analysis, others hold that at its core, cultural studies provides a significant conceptual and methodological framework for cultural, social, and economic critique. This critique is designed to "deconstruct" the meanings and assumptions that are inscribed in the institutions, texts, and practices that work with and through, and produce and re-present, culture. Thus, while some scholars and disciplines have dismissed cultural studies for its methodological rejection of disciplinarity, its core strategies of critique and analysis have influenced areas of the social sciences and humanities; for example, cultural studies work on forms of social differentiation, control and inequality, identity, community-building, media, and knowledge production has had a substantial impact. Moreover, the influence of cultural studies has become increasingly evident in areas as diverse as translation studies, health studies, international relations, development studies, computer studies, economics, archaeology, and neurobiology.

Cultural studies has also diversified its own interests and methodologies, incorporating a range of studies on media policy, democracy, design, leisure, tourism, warfare, and development. While certain key concepts such as ideology or discourse, class, hegemony, identity, and gender remain significant, cultural studies has long engaged with and integrated new concepts and approaches. The field thus continues to pursue political critique through its engagements with the forces of culture and politics.

The Blackwell Companion to Cultural Studies, edited by leading cultural studies scholar Toby Miller, contains essays that analyze the development of cultural studies approaches within each of a wide range of disciplines across the contemporary social sciences and humanities.

Literary scholars
Many cultural studies practitioners work in departments of English or comparative literature. Nevertheless, some traditional literary scholars such as Yale professor Harold Bloom have been outspoken critics of cultural studies. On the level of methodology, these scholars dispute the theoretical underpinning of the movement's critical framework.

Bloom stated his position during the 3 September 2000 episode of C-SPAN's Booknotes, while discussing his book How to Read and Why:

Marxist literary critic Terry Eagleton is not wholly opposed to cultural studies, but has criticised aspects of it and highlighted what he sees as its strengths and weaknesses in books such as After Theory (2003). For Eagleton, literary and cultural theory have the potential to say important things about the "fundamental questions" in life, but theorists have rarely realized this potential.

English departments also host cultural rhetorics scholars. This academic field defines cultural rhetorics as "the study and practice of making meaning and knowledge with the belief that all cultures are rhetorical and all rhetorics are cultural." Cultural rhetorics scholars are interested in investigating topics like climate change, autism, Asian American rhetoric, and more.

Sociology
Cultural studies have also had a substantial impact on sociology. For example, when Stuart Hall left CCCS at Birmingham, it was to accept a prestigious professorship in Sociology at the Open University in Britain.  The subfield of cultural sociology, in particular, is disciplinary home to many cultural studies practitioners.  Nevertheless, there are some differences between sociology as a discipline and the field of cultural studies as a whole.  While sociology was founded upon various historic works purposefully distinguishing the subject from philosophy or psychology, cultural studies have explicitly interrogated and criticized traditional understandings and practices of disciplinarity.  Most CS practitioners think it is best that cultural studies neither emulate disciplines nor aspire to disciplinarity for cultural studies.  Rather, they promote a kind of radical interdisciplinarity as the basis for cultural studies.

One sociologist whose work has had a major influence on cultural studies is Pierre Bourdieu, whose work makes innovative use of statistics and in-depth interviews. However, although Bourdieu's work has been highly influential within cultural studies, and although Bourdieu regarded his work as a form of science, cultural studies has never embraced the idea that it should aspire toward "scientificity," and has marshalled a wide range of theoretical and methodological arguments against the fetishization of "scientificity" as a basis for cultural studies.

Two sociologists who have been critical of cultural studies, Chris Rojek and Bryan S. Turner, argue in their article, "Decorative sociology: towards a critique of the cultural turn," that cultural studies, particularly the flavor championed by Stuart Hall, lacks a stable research agenda, and privileges the contemporary reading of texts, thus producing an ahistorical theoretical focus.  Many, however, would argue, following Hall, that cultural studies have always sought to avoid the establishment of a fixed research agenda; this follows from its critique of disciplinarity.  Moreover, Hall and many others have long argued against the misunderstanding that textual analysis is the sole methodology of cultural studies, and have practiced numerous other approaches, as noted above.  Rojek and Turner also level the accusation that there is "a sense of moral superiority about the correctness of the political views articulated" in cultural studies.

Science wars

In 1996, physicist Alan Sokal expressed his opposition to cultural studies by submitting a hoax article to a cultural studies journal, Social Text. The article, which was crafted as a parody of what Sokal referred to as the "fashionable nonsense" of postmodernism, was accepted by the editors of the journal, which did not at the time practice peer review. When the paper appeared in print, Sokal published a second article in a self-described "academic gossip" magazine, Lingua Franca, revealing his hoax on Social Text. Sokal stated that his motivation stemmed from his rejection of contemporary critiques of scientific rationalism:

In response to this critique, Jacques Derrida wrote:

Founding works 
Hall and others have identified some core originating texts, or the original "curricula," of the field of cultural studies:
 Richard Hoggart's The Uses of Literacy
 Raymond Williams' Culture and Society and The Long Revolution
 E. P. Thompson's The Making of the English Working Class.

See also

Fields and theories

Apocalyptic and post-apocalyptic fiction
Comparative cultural studies
Comparative literature
Critical theory
Cross-cultural studies
Cultural analytics
Cultural anthropology
Cultural assimilation
Cultural consensus theory
Cultural critic
Cultural geography
Cultural hegemony
Cultural heritage
Cultural history
Cultural identity theory
Cultural imperialism
Cultural materialism
Cultural practice
Cultural psychology
Cultural rights
Cultureme
Culturology
Discourse analysis
Dystopia
Ecocriticism
Fan studies
Game studies
Gender studies
Heritage studies
Literary criticism
Literary theory
Media culture
Media studies
Migration studies
Organizational culture
Physical cultural studies
Popular culture studies
Postcolonialism
Postcritique
Queer theory
Semiotics of culture
Social criticism
Social semiotics
Social theory
Sociology of culture
Translation studies
Utopian and dystopian fiction
Visual culture

Organizations

Association for Cultural Typhoon, Japan
The Canadian Association for Cultural Studies
Cultural Studies Association of Australasia
Cultural Studies Association, Taiwan
Cultural Studies Association, Turkey
Cultural Studies Association, US
ECREA – European Communication Research and Education Association, Norway
IBACS, Iberian Association of Cultural Studies, Spain
Inter-Asia Cultural Studies Society, Taiwan
International Center for Cultural Studies, Taiwan
International Association for Translation and Intercultural Studies (IATIS), South Korea
International Society for Cultural History, UK
Media, Communication and Cultural Studies Association, UK

Authors

Fredric Jameson
Ackbar Abbas
Theodor W. Adorno
Giorgio Agamben
Sara Ahmed
Ien Ang
Arjun Appadurai
Marc Augé
Mikhail Bakhtin
Mieke Bal
Roland Barthes
Jean Baudrillard
Zygmunt Bauman
Tony Bennett
Lauren Berlant
Michael Bérubé
Homi K. Bhabha
Rustom Bharucha
Pierre Bourdieu
danah boyd
Peter Burke
Judith Butler
Angie Chabram-Dernersesian
Rey Chow
James Clifford
William E. Connolly
Tim Cresswell
Douglas Crimp
Jonathan Culler
Antonia Darder
Guy Debord
Michel de Certeau
Gilles Deleuze
Jacques Derrida
Richard Dyer
Michael Eric Dyson
Terry Eagleton
John Ellis
Arturo Escobar
Frantz Fanon
John Fiske
Hal Foster
Michel Foucault
Sarah Franklin
Paulo Freire
John Frow
Néstor García Canclini
J.K. Gibson-Graham
Paul Gilroy
Henry Giroux
Antonio Gramsci
Lawrence Grossberg
Elizabeth Grosz
Felix Guattari
Jürgen Habermas
Catherine Hall
Gary Hall
Stuart Hall
Donna Haraway
Michael Hardt
John Hartley
Dick Hebdige
Bob Hodge
Susan Hogan
Richard Hoggart
bell hooks
Max Horkheimer
Eva Illouz
Mizuko Ito
Luce Irigaray
Annamarie Jagose
Rosi Braidotti
Henry Jenkins
Douglas Kellner
Laura Kipnis
Henry Krips
Julia Kristeva
Ernesto Laclau
Scott Lash
Gilles Lipovetsky
Jean-François Lyotard
Herbert Marcuse
Hayden White
Jésus Martín-Barbero
Doreen Massey
Alan McKee
Angela McRobbie
Robert McRuer
Kobena Mercer
Toby Miller
Nicholas Mirzoeff
Chandra Talpade Mohanty
Chantal Mouffe
Meaghan Morris
Hamid Naficy
Antonio Negri
William Nericcio
Griselda Pollock
Elspeth Probyn
Janice Radway
Jacques Ranciere
Eduardo Restrepo
Nelly Richard
Andrew Ross
Edward Said
Beatriz Sarlo
Saskia Sassen
Eve Kosofsky Sedgwick
Richard Sennett
Beverley Skeggs
Edward Soja
Sonjah Stanley Niaah
David Harvey
Gayatri Chakravorty Spivak
Sara Suleri
Tiziana Terranova
E. P. Thompson
Tzvetan Todorov
Graeme Turner
Valentin Voloshinov
Catherine Walsh
Michael Warner
Cornel West
Raymond Williams
Paul Willis
Slavoj Žižek

Journals

Angelaki: Journal of the Theoretical Humanities
Camera Obscura: Feminism, Culture, and Media Studies
Communication and Critical/Cultural Studies
Continuum: Journal of Media & Cultural Studies
Critical Arts: South-North Cultural and Media Studies
Critical Studies in Media Communication
Cultura
Cultural Critique
Cultural Studies
Cultural Studies ↔ Critical Methodologies
Cultural Studies of Science Education
Cultural Studies Review
Culture Machine
differences: A Journal of Feminist Cultural Studies
European Journal of Cultural Studies
French Cultural Studies
Identities: Global Studies in Culture and Power
Inter-Asia Cultural Studies
International Journal of Cultural Studies
Journal for Early Modern Cultural Studies
Journal of African Cultural Studies
Journal of Intercultural Studies
Journal of Latin American Cultural Studies
Journal of Spanish Cultural Studies
New Formations
Open Cultural Studies 
Parallax
Portuguese Cultural Studies
Portuguese Literary & Cultural Studies (PLCS)
Public Culture
Review of Education, Pedagogy and Cultural Studies
Social Text
Space and Culture
Theory, Culture & Society
Topia: Canadian Journal of Cultural Studies

References

Sources

 Du Gay, Paul, et al. 1997. Doing Cultural Studies: The Story of the Sony Walkman. Culture, Media and Identities. London: SAGE, in association with Open University.
 
 Edgar, Andrew, and Peter Sedgwick. 2005. Cultural Theory: The Key Concepts (2nd ed.). New York: Routledge.
 Engel, Manfred. 2008. "Cultural and Literary Studies." Canadian Review of Comparative Literature 31:460–67.
 .
 
 —— 1980. "Cultural Studies: Two Paradigms." Media, Culture, and Society 2.
 —— 1992. "Race, Culture, and Communications: Looking Backward and Forward at Cultural Studies." Rethinking Marxism 5(1):10–18.
Hoggart, Richard. 1957. The Uses of Literacy: Aspects of Working Class Life. Chatto and Windus. 
 Johnson, Richard. 1986–87. "What Is Cultural Studies Anyway?" Social Text 16:38–80.
 —— 2004. "Multiplying Methods: From Pluralism to Combination." Pp. 26–43 in Practice of Cultural Studies. London: SAGE.
 —— "Post-Hegemony? I Don't Think So" Theory, Culture & Society 24(3):95–110.
 
 
Lindlof, T. R., and B. C. Taylor. 2002. Qualitative Communication Research Methods (2nd ed.). Thousand Oaks, CA: SAGE.
 Longhurst, Brian, Greg Smith, Gaynor Bagnall, Garry Crawford, and Michael Ogborn. 2008. Introducing Cultural Studies (2nd ed.). London: Pearson. .
 
 Pollock, Griselda, ed. 1996. Generations and Geographies: Critical Theories and Critical Practices in Feminism and the Visual Arts. Routledge.
 —— 2006. Psychoanalysis and the Image. Boston: Blackwell.
 Smith, Paul. 1991. "A Course In 'Cultural Studies'." The Journal of the Midwest Modern Language Association 24(1):39–49.
 —— 2006. "Looking Backwards and Forwards at Cultural Studies." Pp. 331–40 in A Companion to Cultural Studies, edited by T. Miller. Malden, MA: Blackwell Publishers. .
 Williams, Jeffrey, interviewer. 1994. "Questioning Cultural Studies: An Interview with Paul Smith." Hartford, CT: MLG Institute for Culture and Society, Trinity College. Retrieved 1 July 2020.
Williams, Raymond. 1985. Keywords: A Vocabulary of Culture and Society (revised ed.). New York: Oxford University Press.
 —— 1966. Culture and Society, 1780-1950. New York: Harper & Row.

External links 

CCCS publications (Annual Reports and Stencilled  Papers) of the University of Birmingham 
"The Need for Cultural Studies: Resisting Intellectuals and Oppositional Public Spheres"
CLCWeb: Comparative Literature and Culture at Purdue University

 
Social sciences